Ximena Sariñana is the eponymous second studio album released by Mexican musician Ximena Sariñana, released on August 2, 2011 by Warner Bros. Records.

The album marks Sariñana’s first studio album to be completely recorded and released in English (with the exception of the song “Tú y Yo”, co-written with Natalia Lafourcade). Both a single and a music video for the song “Different” were released in support of the album.

Track listing
All songs composed by Sariñana. Additional credits are noted:

Chart performance

References

2011 albums
Ximena Sariñana albums
Warner Records albums
Albums produced by Dave Sitek